The Cher-Ae Heights Indian Community of the Trinidad Rancheria is a federally recognized tribe with members who are descendants of Chetco, Hupa, Karuk, Tolowa, Wiyot, and Yurok people in Humboldt County, California. As of the 2010 Census the population was 132.

Government
The Cher-Ae Heights Indian Community is headquartered in Trinidad, California. In 1961, the tribe organized under the Articles of Association. In June 2008, a new Constitution was ratified, replaced the Articles of Association. The tribe is governed by a democratically elected five-person community council. The current tribal administration is as follows.

 Chairman: Garth Sundberg
 Vice Chairman: Zack Brown 
 Secretary / Treasurer: Trina Mathewson
 Council Member Seat #1: James Brown Jr. 
 Council Member Seat #2: Robert Hemsted

Reservation

It was established in 1906 to house homeless local California Indians. An additional  of land was purchased for the rancheria in 1908. The Rancheria's lands are within Yurok ancestral territory.

Economic development
The Cher-Ae Heights Indian Community owns and operates the Cher-Ae Heights Casino, Sunrise Deli, Seascape Restaurant, Trinidad pier, Sunset Restaurant, Firewater Lounge, and all are located in Trinidad.

Culture
The Cher-Ae Heights Indian Community of the Trinidad Rancheria is a Federally Recognized Indian Tribe. They are a tribe of historic Yurok Origin and have tribal member families who are direct lineal descendants of Yurok villages. They continue to practice their culture and preserve their language, and are actively involved in traditional ceremonies.

Education
The ranchería is served by the Trinidad Union Elementary School District and Northern Humboldt Union High School District.

See also
Indigenous peoples of California

Notes

References
 Pritzker, Barry M. A Native American Encyclopedia: History, Culture, and Peoples. Oxford: Oxford University Press, 2000.

External links
 Trinidad Rancheria, official website

Native American tribes in California
Federally recognized tribes in the United States
Hupa
Karuk
Tolowa
Wiyot tribe
Yurok
Native Americans in Humboldt County, California
Populated coastal places in California